"Fall" is a song by Nigerian singer Davido, released as the second single from his second studio album A Good Time (2019). The song was produced by Nigerian record producer Kiddominant. According to Rolling Stone magazine, "Fall" was one of the top-100-most-Shazam-searched singles in America in January 2019, and was a top-10 record on Shazam in New York. In February 2019, "Fall" became the longest charting Nigerian pop song in Billboard history. It was ranked at number 163 on Pitchforks list of the 200 Best Songs of the 2010s. As of August 2021, "Fall" has received over 60 million streams on Spotify, and has been certified platinum by the Recording Industry Association of America (RIAA) and gold by Music Canada.

Background
Davido recorded "Fall" in 2017. He sampled a line from Kojo Funds's hit single "Dun Talking". Following plagiarism accusations from fans, Davido revealed to Tobí Akingbade of Metro newspaper that he was inspired by "Dun Talking" and reached out to Kojo Funds prior to releasing "Fall". The song was also the first Afrobeat song to ever be certified gold in the U.S. In February 2019, Busta Rhymes and his artist Prayah released a remix of "Fall". Rhymes used Instagram to build hype around the song before releasing it. However, their version was taken down by YouTube under a directive from Sony Music.

Music video and synopsis
The accompanying music video for "Fall" was directed by Nigerian-born British music video director Daps. In December 2018, the video surpassed 100 million views, becoming the most-viewed video by a Nigerian artist on Youtube. 'Fall' by Davido was also the first nigerian music video to cross 200 million views on youtube  During the video's opening, Davido appears to be in a heated argument with his lover. He exits a Rolls-Royce after the argument and spends the rest of the video daydreaming about being with a ballerina from behind a glass window. Toye Sokunbi of Native magazine stated, "this is consistent with his lyrics that he no longer wants to be a player, so it comes as no surprise that he is seen at the end of the video, apparently brushing off the temptation of being with someone else".

Charts

Weekly charts

Year-end charts

Certifications

References

2017 songs
2017 singles
Davido songs
Song recordings produced by Kiddominant
Nigerian afropop songs